The Uganda Joint Christian Council is a Christian ecumenical organization founded in Uganda in 1963. It is a member of the World Council of Churches and the Fellowship of Christian Councils and Churches in the Great Lakes and Horn of Africa.

Requirement for membership is "A church shall be eligible for membership on condition that it adheres to the authentic teaching of the Bible, the Apostles' Creed, and accepts baptism by water in the name of the Father and of the Son and of the Holy Spirit".  Members include Church of Uganda (Anglican), Roman Catholic Church in Uganda, and the Eastern Orthodox Church in Uganda. The Uganda Bible Society, Uganda Joint Medical Stores, and the Ecumenical Church Loan Fund (ECLOF) (Uganda) are associate members.

References

External links 
Official website
World Council of Churches listing

Members of the World Council of Churches
National councils of churches
Christian organizations based in Africa
Christianity in Uganda
Religious organisations based in Uganda
Christian organizations established in 1963
1963 establishments in Uganda